Aghavnatun (formerly, Akhavnatukh) is a village in the Armavir Province of Armenia. it is home to ruins of an iron-age fortress, a 13th-century tomb and a chapel. 

There are four churches in the village, the oldest of which is Surp Gevork Church of the 10th century. A circular tower of an unknown purpose is found on a hill top near the village.

Gallery

See also 
Armavir Province

References

Populated places in Armavir Province